Bull Mountain may refer to:

Places in the United States
 Bull Mountain, Oregon, a hill and an unincorporated community in Oregon
 Bull Mountain (Box Elder County, Utah), a mountain in Utah
 Bull Mountains, a mountain range in Montana

Other uses
 Bull Mountain (instruction), code name for Intel's hardware random number generator and for the RdRand instruction it feeds
 Bull Mountain, a novel by the American Brian Panowich

See also
 Bull Run Mountains, a mountain range in Virginia, US
 Bull Run Mountains (Nevada), a mountain range US
 Gustav Bull Mountains, mountain peaks in Mac. Robertson Land, Antarctica
 Bull Hill, or Mount Taurus, a mountain in the State of New York, US